Irina Evgenyevna Cherniaeva (born 29 October 1955, in Moscow) is a Russian former pair skater who competed for the Soviet Union. With her skating partner, Vasili Blagov, she represented the Soviet Union at the 1972 Winter Olympics where they placed 6th.

As of 2018, Tcherniaeva is a skating coach at Anglet Sports de Glace in France. She is the mother of ice dancer Marina Anissina and ice hockey player Mikhail Anisin, and is of Ukrainian descent.

Competitive highlights
(with Blagov)

References

Navigation

Russian female pair skaters
Soviet female pair skaters
Olympic figure skaters of the Soviet Union
Figure skaters at the 1972 Winter Olympics
Living people
Figure skaters from Moscow
1955 births
Russian people of Ukrainian descent
Russian emigrants to France